Marlboro is a census-designated place (CDP) in Cumberland County, New Jersey, United States. It is in Stow Creek Township on the northwestern edge of the county, bordered to the northwest, across Sarah Run, by Quinton Township in Salem County. The CDP contains the unincorporated communities of Marlboro and Campbells Corner.

New Jersey Route 49 passes through the CDP, leading southeast  to Bridgeton, the Cumberland county seat, and northwest  to Salem.

Marlboro was first listed as a CDP prior to the 2020 census.

Demographics

References 

Census-designated places in Cumberland County, New Jersey
Census-designated places in New Jersey
Stow Creek Township, New Jersey